Lisa Anderson (born October 16, 1950) is an American political scientist and the former President of the American University in Cairo (AUC).

Research and career
A specialist on Middle Eastern and North African politics, Anderson served as the President of AUC from 2011 to 2016 and as Provost from 2008 to 2010. Prior to joining AUC, Anderson served as the James T. Shotwell Professor of International Relations at Columbia University, the dean of Columbia's School of International and Public Affairs, the chair of the political science department and the director of the Middle East Institute.  Previously, she was an assistant professor of government and social studies at Harvard University.

Anderson announced her departure from AUC in June 2015, shortly after an AUC Student Union referendum registered a 97% disapproval rating of her management, which included numerous controversial financial decisions. Some 2,600 students and employees participated.

Affiliations
Anderson is the former president of the Middle East Studies Association (MESA) and former chair of the board of the Social Science Research Council.  Anderson is also a former member of the Council of the American Political Science Association and served on the board of the Carnegie Council on Ethics in International Affairs.  She is member emerita of the board of Human Rights Watch, where she served as co-chair of Human Rights Watch/Middle East, co-chair of the International Advisory Board of the Alexander von Humboldt Foundation and member of the International Advisory Council of the World Congress for Middle East Studies.  She is also a member of the Council on Foreign Relations.

Education
Anderson holds a Bachelor of Arts from Sarah Lawrence College and a Master of Arts in Law and Diplomacy from The Fletcher School at Tufts University.  She earned her Ph.D in political science from Columbia University in 1981, where she also received a certificate from the Middle East Institute. Her academic research focuses on state formation, regime change, and economic and political development in the Middle East.

Recognition
In 2002, Anderson received an honorary doctor of laws from Monmouth University. In fall 2013, she visited the American Academy in Berlin as a Richard C. Holbrooke Distinguished Visitor. In 2015, she received an honorary degree from the American University in Paris and was elected as a member of the American Academy of Arts and Sciences.

Selected publications
 Pursuing Truth, Exercising Power: Social Science and Public Policy in the Twenty-first Century (Columbia University Press, 2003)
 The State and Social Transformation in Tunisia and Libya, 1830–1980 (Princeton University Press, 1986)
 Transitions to Democracy, Editor (Columbia University Press, 1999)
 The Origins of Arab Nationalism (co-editor; Columbia University Press, 1991)

References

External links
Official Website from the American University in Cairo
Lisa Anderson as the Richard C. Holbrooke Distinguished Visitor in Fall 2013 at the American Academy in Berlin

American women political scientists
American political scientists
American international relations scholars
Sarah Lawrence College alumni
The Fletcher School at Tufts University alumni
Harvard University faculty
Academic staff of The American University in Cairo
Columbia University faculty
Columbia University alumni
1950 births
Living people
American expatriates in Egypt
American women academics
21st-century American women